The following is a list of United States mints, past and present:

From 1965 to 1967 all U.S. coins were struck without mint marks.  As it was clear from Gresham's law that the rising cost of silver (and the ensuing removal of most silver from coinage in 1965) led to hoarding or even melting of silver-based pre-1965 coins, overzealous collection of specific mint marks of those years by numismatists almost certainly would have exacerbated those shortages.

Pioneer coinage, tokens, private issue coins and paper money do not have official mint marks.

See also

The Dalles Mint

External links
U.S. Mint facilities

Economic history of the United States
United States Mint